Blue Mound Township is a township in Vernon County, in the U.S. state of Missouri.

Blue Mound Township takes its name from the summit of the same name within its borders.

References

Townships in Missouri
Townships in Vernon County, Missouri